Leafie, A Hen into the Wild, also called Daisy, A Hen into the Wild in English-speaking countries, is a 2011 South Korean animated drama film which depicts the freedom, will and instinctive motherly love of a hen as she raises an adopted duckling. The film  made box office history by drawing over 2.2 million viewers, the largest audience for a home-grown animated film in South Korea. It also received widespread critical acclaim upon release.

Source material
The film is based on a well-respected and extremely popular children's book authored by Hwang Sun-mi. The novel was first released in South Korea in 2000, and sold more than 1 million copies domestically. It has been sold to nine countries including France, Poland, Japan, China, Vietnam, Thailand and Italy. The Polish-translated version of the novel was named the "Best Book of the Year 2012" and "Best Book of Spring 2012" (Najlepsza książka na wiosnę 2012) by Granice.pl, a renowned literary organization in Poland. It was translated into English by Chi-young Kim for Penguin Books under the title The Hen Who Dreamed She Could Fly, and the 144-page novel was published on November 26, 2013.

Plot (Korean Version)

Leafie (잎싹, leaf (잎) + sprout (싹)) lives on a chicken farm with many other egg-laying hens that are in battery cages. She dreams of being a mother, however she can't incubate her own eggs. Dreaming of having her own young,  she devises an escape plan; she faints, causing the farmer to think that she is dead and to take her from the cage to dump with other dead hens. After the farmer leaves, Leafie slowly wakes up, but then she hears someone warning her to wake up and she finds herself confronted and threatened by a one-eyed weasel known as One-Eye (애꾸눈 "Aeggunun"). Her life is saved through the intervention of Wanderer (a mallard duck, 나그네 "Nagnae") who saves her by trapping the weasel in the farmer's wheelbarrow but then leaves without a word, not even giving Leafie his name when she asks.

Leafie returns to the farm to join the group of farm animals who reside outside the egg farm in the yard, but the animals there aren't fond of her and she gets into an argument with the barnyard rooster who refuses to allow her into his flock, insisting that her place is to simply spend her life laying eggs.

With nowhere else to go, Leafie leaves the farm and arrives in the wild, where she meets Mr. Otter (달수 "Dalsu"), who has heard about Leafie and helps her find a place to live on Wanderer's behalf. The now wild hen meets Wanderer again, and discovers he has a mate. However, that very night, One-Eye attacks and Wanderer's mate tragically dies.

After hearing the commotion, Leafie enters the nest and finds a single egg. Wanderer decides to let Leafie look after the egg for a few days, meaning to exact revenge on One-Eye and ensure their protection. Wanderer instructs Leafie to take his unborn child to the everglades, telling her she will understand why in time before he leaves her to find the weasel. That night One-Eye returns, and Wanderer engages her in a fight to the death. Leafie witnesses the battle and Wanderer is killed by One-Eye, leaving Leafie completely heartbroken.

After Wanderer's death, the egg hatches into a duckling that imprints on Leafie, thinking that the hen is his mother. Leafie tearfully accepts him as her son and names him "Chorok head" or "Greenie" (초록머리, 초록(이) in the movie), and together they head to the glade where Wanderer asked.

Leafie raises Greenie and watches him grow up. Mr. Otter teaches Greenie to swim, and later enlists the help from a local bat and an owl to help a then-teenaged Greenie learn how to fly. One day, however, Greenie tries befriending some mandarin ducks who he meets, but they make fun of Leafie, who they think is crazy. Meanwhile, Leafie is saddened to learn the local water birds don't like or accept her in their community when Mr. Otter accidentally blurts it out to her. She then meets up with Greenie, who has been teased by the other ducks and blames Leafie for him being an outcast. After discovering that they are indeed both different, Greenie runs away, feeling that he doesn't need her anymore.

Hearing about this, Mr. Otter attempts to comfort her by telling her about Wanderer - him having been the guard duck of his flock and of how he crippled his wing while fighting One-Eye, who lost one of her eyes in the struggle, and of how Wanderer was subsequently imprisoned by the farmer although he managed to escape. Meanwhile, Greenie meets the barnyard's four white ducks who introduce him to the farm, but after coming across the place he is captured by the Farmer, who intends on clipping his wings, however, Chirpie, a sparrow who is friends with Leafie, sees this and goes to warn Leafie about what's happening.

To distract the farmer, Leafie, with the help of Mr. Otter, releases all of the hens and manages to get them out of their cages after Mr. Otter scares them all. Leafie reunites with Greenie and Mr. Otter frees him by biting off the string that held him down, however, Rooster stops them and calls Leafie a disgrace to chickens everywhere, and in a short scuffle, all of the animals discover Rooster's comb is fake and one of the ducks assumes his place as the one in charge. Leafie escapes the farm with Greenie and Mr. Otter, and both Leafie and Greenie reconcile after Mr. Otter departs. The two are suddenly confronted by One-Eye, who then hunts down Greenie to eat him. Despite Leafie's intervention, the weasel managed to pin Greenie down on an old tree, which breaks off and sends the two plummeting over a cliff. Believing Greenie to be dead, Leafie mourns, but Greenie escaped certain death by successfully learning how to fly while One-Eye managed to save herself by grabbing hold of a ledge on the cliff.

A flock of ducks soon come during the autumn season, and Leafie realizes what Wanderer meant when he instructed her to take his egg to the everglades. An adult Greenie goes to meet the flock and learns about an upcoming contest to decide who will be the new guard duck of the flock. The ducks flee from Greenie after seeing the human string that was still wrapped around his leg from his past encounter with the farmer. Leafie gives Greenie her support and reassures him to participate in the contest after taking a portion of the human string from his leg just in time. Greenie returns to the flock and announced that he wants to be in the contest as well, quickly forming a rivalry with another duck named Red Head.

During the race, Greenie recalls the words of his mentors, and successfully wins the contest, becoming the new guard duck of the flock. After the competition, Leafie finds a nest of baby weasels which she begins to take care of. While Rooster is finding a home with Mr. Otter after escaping from the farm, Greenie tries to find Leafie to say his goodbyes but comes across One-Eye once again and saves a female duck from the hungry carnivore. Their brief scuffle lands them in front of Leafie and the nest of baby weasels, and One-Eye pins down Greenie, preparing to kill him. Leafie attempts to help Greenie, but One-Eye threatens her to not come near. During the confrontation, the baby weasels Leafie had been caring for are revealed to be One-Eye's offspring. This makes Leafie realize that the weasel who killed Wanderer and his mate, was just killing to provide food for her kits. After agreeing to not harm the weasel kits in exchange for letting Greenie go, Leafie and Greenie were allowed to escape. Before they leave, Leafie sees how One-Eye, who is malnourished due to the rough winter season, is unable to produce milk to feed her offspring.

The flock of ducks prepare to leave the everglades, and Leafie and Greenie say their heartfelt goodbyes to one another before Greenie departs with his flock, now able to set out and see the world. Leafie then wonders why she never thought about learning to fly before One-Eye finds her. Knowing that One-Eye will have to find food for the winter and that Greenie can now take care of himself (as well as knowing she was now too weak to survive the coming season), Leafie decides to let One-Eye kill her so she can feed her offspring. Upon realizing this, One-Eye tearfully kills Leafie and it is implied that she is able to fly in spirit, watching as Greenie flies with his flock.

Characters
Leafie/Yipsak/Sprout/Daisy Voiced by: Moon So-ri (Korean), Stacey DePass (English)
The leading character, Leafie, exhibits strength. Free-spirited and courageous, she doesn't settle for the fate she is given but accepts challenges and welcomes adventure. It is shown that Leafie tends to speak loudly, a trait that Greenie inherits. She was originally stuck in an egg farm, but she escapes by playing dead. While in a pit filled with dead chickens, the One-eyed Weasel appears and attacks Leafie to eat her, when Wanderer shows up, and saves her. Leafie immediately falls in love with him, but this quickly changes when she finds out he already has a mate. Before Wanderer died, he told her to take his unborn child to the everglades. When she asks why, he says "you will find out in time." She then raises Greenie despite numerous difficulties. It's been shown throughout the film that Leafie developed a cold and would not have likely survived the winter month.

Greenie/Chorok Head/Green-Top/Willie Voiced by: Han Shin-jeong & Yoo Seung-ho (Korean), Bryn McAuley & Toby Proctor (English)
Greenie is a male wild mallard duck, and is the son of Wanderer, but is adopted by Leafie after Wanderer and his mate (Greenie's biological mother) dies. As a teenager, Greenie had a difficult time making friends with the other ducks, because his mother is a chicken. Because of this, he considered leaving Leafie, but after the scuffle at the chicken farm, Greenie accepts Leafie as his mother. Thanks to Mr. Otter, a bat, and an owl, Greenie grows up to be a strong duck and a good flier, and, thanks to this, he wins a contest held by the ducks to become a "guard duck". Greenie noticeably inherits Leafie's trait of being loud.

Wanderer/Nagnae/Straggler/Wilson Voiced by: Choi Min-sik (Korean), Ryan Hollyman (English)
Wanderer is a mallard and a former guard duck. Guard ducks help defend their flocks from predators. He helped protect Leafie from the Weasel at the beginning of the film, which leads to Leafie falling in love with him, but this quickly changes when she finds out he already has a mate. He lived with his wife in a brier patch until the one-eyed weasel killed them both. They left behind one egg, which Leafie hatched, and later named the duckling Greenie. Before Wanderer died, he told Leafie to go to the everglades with his unborn child. When she asks him why, he says "you will find out in time." Mr. Otter tells Leafie that, when Wanderer was a guard duck, he got into a fight with the weasel, One-Eye. In the end, he couldn't use his right wing to fly anymore, but, in return, the weasel loses sight in one of her eyes.

Rooster Voiced by: Um Sang-hyun (Korean), Juan Chioran (English)
Rooster is the leader of the chicken flock and a pompous and egotistical rooster that lives freely in the yard. Even though Leafie admires him greatly, Rooster views her admiration as disrespect and refuses to allow Leafie to join his flock and tells her to go back to laying eggs. Near the middle of the film, it is discovered that his comb is a fake, which then leads the animals of the barn to make him work for them. He then leaves, after seeing Greenie racing Red Head, and goes to find a home with Mr. Otter.

Mayor or Mr. Otter Voiced by: Park Chul-min (Korean), Christian Potenza (English)
Mr. Otter is the local real estate agent who runs the wildlife community. He helps Leafie survive in the wild by helping her find a place to live and introducing her son to mentors, such as a bat and an owl who teach Greenie how to fly. Before Greenie leaves with the flock, he tells Mr. Otter to watch over his mother.

One-eyed Weasel Voiced by: Kim Sang-hyeon (Korean), Stacey DePass (English)
One-Eye is portrayed as the antagonist in the story, as she persists in hunting Leafie and the ducks for food. She is a predator feared by those who live in the brier patch and everglades, and only eats live prey and those that catches her interest. During her first fight with Wanderer, she lost an eye during the struggle, but managed very well without it afterwards. However, at the end of the story, it is revealed that she is not actually evil, just trying to provide food for her family as she became a mother too.

Red Head/Ace Voiced by: Sa Seong-ung (Korean), L. Dean Ifill (English)
Red Head is a rival wild duck that competed with Greenie to be a guard duck. However, after the competition, he good-naturedly becomes friends with Greenie.

Chirpie Voiced by: Jeon Suk-kyeong (Korean), Bryn McAuley (English)
A high-pitched talking sparrow who is friends with Leafie and Greenie. He always visits Leafie at the farm sometimes, When he saw Greenie being attacked by the farmer he and his fellow sparrow friends distracted the farmer. He possess a dislike towards Rooster who always chases his flock off.

Owl Voiced by: Seo Seung-won (Korean), L. Dean Ifill (English)
Owl helped Greenie how to fly.

Bat Voiced by: Hong Beom-gi (Korean), Ryan Hollyman (English)
Bat helped Greenie to do some flying tricks, but required the duck to hang upside down to begin his training, to which Greenie found impossible. He also possess a dislike towards Mr. Otter, who suggested the bat to live in a cave, but it drips constantly with water.

Wanderer's Mate Voiced by: Kim Ji-hye (Korean)
A female white duck who lived with Wanderer and was Greenie`s mother until the One-eyed Weasel killed her.

Bully Voiced by: Ron Basch (English)
A tough strong duck who competed in the race against Greenie.

Blade Voiced by: Drew Nelson (English)
A duck who participated in the guard duck race and tried to blind Greenie with sand but crashed into a tree during the race.

Flock Leader Voiced by: Ryan Hollyman (English)
A wise mallard who acts as the leader of the flock.

The Farmer Voiced by: Walker Boone (English)
An elderly man who owns the chicken farm, He often does his job picking up the dead chickens from their cages, putting them in his wheelbarrow and dumping them in a pit of dead chickens. He often captures wild ducks and keeps them in his farm just like he did to Wanderer after crippling his wing in the aftermath of his battle against One-Eye (but managed to escape). Later in the film he caught Greenie after he entered the farm and tied a string on him and attaching it to his wheelbarrow, grabbed scissors and attempted to clip his wings, Luckily Leafie came to the rescue and attacked the farmer, but only to throw her in the chicken house. Chirpie and his fellow flock distracted the farmer and after his chickens went free, He was confused and couldn't get to Greenie and never harmed his wings, After that he is never seen again for the rest of the film. He is the only human character in the film.

Dol, Mee, Rae and Toe Voiced by: Shoshana Sperling (English; Dol), Angela Besharah (English; Rae), Drew Nelson (English; Mee), Catherine Disher (English; Toe)
Four small white ducks who are clumsy and weird. Dol and Toe are twins and Mee and Rae are twins. They all like singing songs about themselves due to their names as a pun on do-re-mi and like following the leader. After discovering Rooster's comb was a fake, Mee took it and played around with it.

The Dog Voiced by: Ron Basch (English)
A guard dog that barks and growls at strangers and acts ferocious and aggressive, but becomes docile once he's petted and scratched, revealing to be a softy.

The Hens Voiced by: Shoshana Sperling (English; Barn hen), Catherine Disher (English; Mother hen)
Two hens who live freely in the yard. One of the hens has children of their own while the other one is still incubating their eggs. They have a strong dislike of Leafie and the other hen hates her children being near her. The two hens were later shocked when they discover Rooster's comb was a fake.

Production
Director Oh Sung-yoon struggled for more than twenty years as an animator under adverse economic circumstances before finally debuting with this feature film.

Shim Jae-myung (also known as Jaime Shim), the head of Myung Films, which co-produced Leafie in conjunction with the local animation studio Odolttogi, said that it was her experience with major motion pictures that made her want to produce animated films that could compete with those from Hollywood and Japan. "And as a woman and mother, the plot touched my heart," she said. "Many people were doubtful about whether the film would be a success, but I believed in the power of the novel."

When asked what they did to distinguish their film from films by the world's major studios, director Oh said he and the crew focused on making the visual effects as beautiful as possible. "Most of my staff and I majored in painting, and we chose to make the film two-dimensional, so that the entire product looks like a beautiful picture," Oh said. Though the sharply drawn foreground characters have an international look, the gentler backgrounds seem typically Korean in their use of landscape and flora (with the Upo wetlands in the south of the country inspiring the everglades in which much of the action takes place). "In addition to that, we have many quality animators on staff who draw for Pixar and Disney in Korea." Disney, Pixar and DreamWorks often hire small- and medium-sized Korean animation studios to work on their illustrations.

Soundtrack
The South Korean and English versions each contain a different soundtrack. The South Korean soundtrack is composed by Lee Ji-soo while the English soundtrack is composed by Patrick Cannell. The former was released in on CD in 2011, consisting of 22 tracks.

Reception
Historically South Korean animated features have struggled to draw viewers. This prolonged slump is evidenced by My Beautiful Girl, Mari (2001), Wonderful Days (2003), Oseam (2003), Aachi & Ssipak (2005), and Yobi, the Five Tailed Fox (2006) which all performed dismally at the box office. No domestic animated film had ever achieved 1 million viewers.

Undaunted by the knowingly discouraging prognoses from industry insiders, Leafie went on to rake in more than 2.2 million tickets, while recouping its production budget in just four weeks. It has become South Korea's most successful animated film since the country's first feature-length cartoon, A Story of Hong Gildong (1967).

Awards
Leafie won Best Sitges Family Film Diploma at the 2011 Sitges Film Festival in Spain as well as the award for Best Animated Feature Film at the 2011 Asia Pacific Screen Awards held in Australia.

For her contribution to the popularization of Korean animation, producer Shim Jae-myung (a.k.a. Jaime Shim) CEO of Myung Films won a Special Mention at the 2011 Korean Association of Film Critics Awards.

Localization

English version 
Racking up numerous sales at the American Film Market, the film was picked up by Toronto-based 108 Media Group for distribution in English-speaking countries including Canada, U.S., Australia, Ireland, U.K. and New Zealand and was retitled Daisy: A Hen Into the Wild. It was released direct-to-DVD in the United States by Olive Films and in the United Kingdom by Signature Entertainment in 2014, and had also been broadcast on television on Starz Kids and Family. The English version was partly re-edited from the original version, with six minutes (such as a bit with the hens laying their eggs and One-Eye tearing up as she lunges at Leafie) being removed, the character names being changed (Leafie's name was changed to Daisy, Greenie was changed to Willie, Wanderer was changed to Wilson and Red Head was changed to Ace), and a new score composed by Patrick Cannell replacing the original score.

Other territories 
Leafie also sold to German-speaking territories via Ascot Elit and Brazil's Conquest Filmes. It has so far secured deals for 46 countries around Asia, Europe and the Middle East after going on sale at Busan's Asian Film Market, Cannes's MIPCOM and Rome's Business Street.

It became the first Korean animated film to play at Chinese theaters, opening at 3,000 screens, which is over one-third of the country's total. Clearly elated at the film's warm reception by the Chinese media, director Oh said he hoped this breaks new ground as investors traditionally judge projects based on their appeal to viewers in English-speaking countries. "It's time to change the standard," he said. "In the future, I'll focus more on the cultural values of the animation rather than giving too much emphasis to the business aspect."

Stage adaptation
A stage play based on the book and film ran from June 22 to September 2, 2012 at the COEX Art Hall in Seoul.

References

External links
 
 

2011 films
2011 animated films
2010s adventure drama films
Animated adventure films
Animated drama films
Animated films about ducks
Animated films based on children's books
Best Animated Feature Film Asia Pacific Screen Award winners
Animated films about chickens
Films about ducks
Films about otters
2010s Korean-language films
Lotte Entertainment films
Myung Films films
South Korean adventure drama films
South Korean animated films
2011 drama films
2010s South Korean films
Films about weasels